Grand Piano Canyon is the 22nd solo album by Bob James. It was released on June 28, 1990. The cover art is reproduced from an original painting by David Grath entitled "Grand Piano Canyon." The title for the seventh track, "Xraxse" is the planet inhabited by Blue People in a story written by James' daughter, Hilary, at age 6.

Critical reception

Scott Yanow of AllMusic writes, "This CD is more jazz-oriented than most of Bob James' recordings and even takes chances in a few spots. The tunes, mostly by James, contain several strong melodies, including a tribute piece for Sarah Vaughan; among the sidemen are guitarist Lee Ritenour, Kirk Whalum on tenor and soprano, and (in a guest spot) tenor great Michael Brecker."

Stanton Zeff of Audioholics gives the album a rating of 5 overall and says, "This CD had a little bit of everything: big-band ( "Bare Bones" ), smooth jazz ( "Restoration" ), fusion ( "…stop that!" ), and ballads ( "Just Listen" )." He also writes, "It's this last collaboration that led to the creation of one of the great jazz super-groups of the last decade: Fourplay, featuring Harvey Mason on drums and Nathan East on bass, Lee Ritenour on guitars, and Bob James on keyboards."

Track listing

Personnel

All songs written by Bob James, except where noted.

1 – "Bare Bones" (Bob James, Max Risenhoover) - 4:44
 Bob James – acoustic piano, horn arrangements
 Dean Brown – guitar
 Nathan East – bass
 Harvey Mason – drums
 Chris Hunter – alto saxophone
 Andy Snitzer – tenor saxophone
 Roger Rosenberg – baritone saxophone
 Jim Pugh – trombone
 Jon Faddis – trumpet
 Randy Brecker – trumpet
 Mixed by Bill Schnee
 Recorded by Gene Curtis, Max Risenhoover and Al Schmitt.

2 – "Restoration" - 5:44
 Bob James – acoustic piano, arrangements
 Lee Ritenour – guitar
 Nathan East – bass
 Harvey Mason – drums
 Leonard "Doc" Gibbs – percussion
 Mixed by Bill Schnee
 Recorded by Al Schmitt and Bill Schnee.

3 – "Wings For Sarah" - 5:34
 Bob James – acoustic piano, arrangements
 Lee Ritenour – guitar
 Nathan East – bass
 Harvey Mason – drums
 Leonard "Doc" Gibbs – percussion
 Mixed by Bill Schnee
 Recorded by Max Risenhoover and Al Schmitt

4 – "Svengali" - 4:48
 Bob James – acoustic piano, arrangements
 Eric Gale – guitar
 Gary King – bass
 Harvey Mason – drums
 Paulinho da Costa – percussion
 Kirk Whalum – tenor saxophone, soprano saxophone
 Mixed by Bill Schnee
 Recorded by Hank Cicalo, Steve Holroyd, Max Risenhoover and Al Schmitt.

5 – "Worlds Apart" - 4:30
 Bob James – acoustic piano, synthesizers, arrangements 
 Dean Brown – guitar
 Abraham Laboriel – bass
 Harvey Mason – drums
 Leonard "Doc" Gibbs – percussion
 Mixed by Max Risenhoover
 Recorded by Max Risenhoover and Al Schmitt.

6 – "…Stop That!" (James, Risenhoover) - 4:43
 Bob James – acoustic piano, arrangements 
 Dean Brown – guitar
 Nathan East – bass
 Max Risenhoover – drums, recording, mixing
 Chris Hunter – alto saxophone
 Roger Rosenberg – baritone saxophone
 Michael Brecker – tenor sax solo
 Andy Snitzer – tenor saxophone
 Jim Pugh – trombone
 Jon Faddis – trumpet
 Randy Brecker – trumpet

7 – "Xraxse" - 4:29
 Bob James – acoustic piano, synthesizers, arrangements
 Max Risenhoover – drums, percussion sequencing, recording, mixing

8 – "Just Listen" (Lee Ritenour) - 7:11
 Bob James – acoustic piano, electric piano
 Lee Ritenour – Takamine classical guitar synthesizer, rhythm arrangements
 Nathan East – Clavenger bass
 Harvey Mason – drums, percussion sequencing
 Leonard "Doc" Gibbs – percussion
 Recorded by Max Risenhoove and Al Schmitt.
 Mixed by Bill Schnee

9 – "Far From Turtle" (Risenhoover) - 6:28
 Bob James – acoustic piano
 Max Risenhoover – synthesizers, percussion, arrangements, recording, mixing
 Nathan East – Clevenger bass
 Mary Benander – Japanese phrases

Track information and credits adapted the album's liner notes.

Production 
 Bob James – producer
 Max Risenhoover – associate producer, E-mu Emulator III programming, Opcode Vision programming 
 Ted Jensen – mastering at Sterling Sound (New York City, NY).

Charts

References

External links
Bob James Official Site
Warner Records Official Site

1990 albums
Bob James (musician) albums
Albums produced by Bob James (musician)
Warner Records albums